His Favourite Pastime is a 1914 American comedy film starring Charlie Chaplin.

Synopsis
Charlie gets drunk in the bar. He steps outside, meets a pretty woman, tries to flirt with her, only to retreat after the woman's father returns. Returning to the bar, Charlie drinks some more and engages in rogue behaviors with others. He finally leaves the bar, sees the woman leaving, follows the woman home, and proceeds to make a nuisance of himself, eventually getting kicked out of the house.

Reviews
Although Chaplin had only been making comedies for Mack Sennett's Keystone Studio for less than two months when this film was released in March 1914, a reviewer from Moving Picture World recognized Chaplin's merry-making talents. He wrote, "The comedian, whose favorite pastime is drinking cocktails, is clever. In fact, [he is] the best one Mack Sennett has ever sprung on the public. He is a new one and deserves mention."

Motion Picture News was also full of praise for His Favorite Pastime. Its reviewer wrote, "If there is an audience any where that does not roar when they see this comedy, they cannot be in full possession of their wits. It is absolutely the funniest thing the Keystone Company has ever put out, and this is not written by a press agent. Mr. Chaplin has introduced a number of funny actions that are original to the American stage."

Cast
 Charles Chaplin - Drunken masher
 Roscoe 'Fatty' Arbuckle - Shabby drunk
 Peggy Pearce - Beautiful lady

See also
 List of American films of 1914
 Charlie Chaplin filmography
 Fatty Arbuckle filmography

External links
 
 
 

1914 films
1914 comedy films
Silent American comedy films
American silent short films
American black-and-white films
Films directed by George Nichols
Films produced by Mack Sennett
1914 short films
Articles containing video clips
American comedy short films
1910s American films
1910s English-language films